Mauritia is a genus of sea snails, marine gastropod molluscs in the family Cypraeidae, the cowries. These shelled molluscs are generally exclusive on the island of Mauritius, hence their name Mauritia.

Species
Species within the genus Mauritia include:
 Mauritia arabica (Linnaeus, 1758)
 † Mauritia campbelliana (Pilsbry, 1922) 
Mauritia depressa (Gray)
Mauritia eglantina (Duclos, 1833)
Mauritia grayana Schilder, 1930
Mauritia histrio (Gmelin, 1791)
Mauritia maculifera Schilder, 1932
Mauritia mauritiana (Linnaeus, 1758)
Mauritia scurra (Gmelin, 1791)
 † Mauritia uzestensis Dolin & Lozouet, 2004

 Species brought into synonymy  
Mauritia mappa (Linnaeus, 1758): synonym of Leporicypraea mappa (Linnaeus, 1758)

References

 Heiman E.L. (2004) Intraspecific variation in Mauritia arabica (Linnaeus, 1758). Visaya 1(2):4-18
 Liu, J.Y. [Ruiyu] (ed.). (2008). Checklist of marine biota of China seas. China Science Press. 1267 pp.
 Burgess, C.M. (1970). The Living Cowries. AS Barnes and Co, Ltd. Cranbury, New Jersey.

External links
  Felix Lorenz and Alex Hubert : A Guide to Worldwide Cowries, second revised edition
  Linnaeus, C. (1758). Systema Naturae per regna tria naturae, secundum classes, ordines, genera, species, cum characteribus, differentiis, synonymis, locis. Editio decima, reformata [10th revised edition, vol. 1: 824 pp. Laurentius Salvius: Holmiae]

Gastropod genera
Cypraeidae